Allen, Allen's or Allens may refer to:

Buildings
 Allen Arena, an indoor arena at Lipscomb University in Nashville, Tennessee
 Allen Center, a skyscraper complex in downtown Houston, Texas
 Allen Fieldhouse, an indoor sports arena on the University of Kansas campus in Lawrence
 Allen House (disambiguation)
 Allen Power Plant (disambiguation)

Businesses
Allen (brand), an American tool company
Allen's, an Australian brand of confectionery
Allens (law firm), an Australian law firm formerly known as Allens Arthur Robinson
Allen's (restaurant), a former hamburger joint and nightclub in Athens, Georgia, United States
Allen & Company LLC, a small, privately held investment bank
Allens of Mayfair, a butcher shop in London from 1830 to 2015
Allens Boots, a retail store in Austin, Texas
 Allens, Inc., a brand of canned vegetables based in Arkansas, US, now owned by Del Monte Foods
Allen's department store, a.k.a. Allen's, George Allen, Inc., Philadelphia, USA

People
 Allen (surname), a list of people
 Allen (given name), a list of people and fictional characters
 The Allen Brothers (Australia), a 1960s cabaret act

Places
Mount Allen (disambiguation)

Ireland
Allen, County Kildare, a village
Hill of Allen, County Kildare
Bog of Allen

United Kingdom
River Allen (disambiguation), four rivers, all in England
Allen, a townland of County Tyrone, Northern Ireland

United States
Allen, Alabama, an unincorporated community in Clarke County, Alabama
Allen, Arizona, a ghost town
Allen, Kansas, a city
Allen, Kentucky, a city
Allen, Louisiana, an unincorporated community
Allen, Maryland, an unincorporated community
Allen, Michigan, a village
Allen, Mississippi, an unincorporated community
Allen, Nebraska, a village
Allens, an alternate name for Allens Station, New Jersey, an unincorporated community
Allen, New York, a town
Allen, Oklahoma, a town
Allen, South Dakota, a census-designated place
Allen, Texas, a city
Allen, West Virginia, an unincorporated community
Allen, Wisconsin, an unincorporated community
Allen Township (disambiguation)
Allen County (disambiguation)
Allen Parish, Louisiana
Allen Mountain (Montana)
Allen Mountain (New York)
Allen Island (Maine)
Allen Parkway, a major street in Houston, Texas
Allens Bay, Minnesota

Elsewhere
Allen, Río Negro, Argentina, a city
Allen Island, Queensland, Australia
Allen Island (Nunavut), Canada
Allen, Northern Samar, Philippines, a municipality
Allen Rocks, Ross Island, Antarctica

Schools
 Allen Community College, a junior college in Iola, Kansas
 Allen High School (disambiguation)
 Allen University, a private, coeducational historically black university in Columbia, South Carolina

Television
 "Allen" (Prison Break), an episode of the TV series Prison Break
 "Allen" (Aqua Unit Patrol Squad 1), a two-part episode of the television series Aqua Teen Hunger Force

Transportation
 Allen (1913 Ohio automobile), an early American automobile
 Allen (1913 Philadelphia automobile), an early American automobile
 Allen Parkway, Houston, Texas, U.S.
 Allen Road, Toronto, Canada
 Allen station, a freeway-median light rail station in Los Angeles, California, U.S.
 Allen Street, Manhattan, New York, U.S.

Other uses
 Allen (robot), a 1980s robot
 Allen baronets, two extinct titles, one in the Baronetage of England and one in the Baronetage of the United Kingdom
 Allen Army Air Field, Fort Greely, Alaska
 Allen Telescope Array, California
 Allen's interval algebra, a calculus for temporal reasoning
 Allen's Coffee Brandy, a liqueur
 Hurricane Allen (1980)

See also 
 Van Allen (disambiguation)
 Justice Allen (disambiguation)
 Alan (disambiguation)
 Alen (given name)
 Allan (disambiguation)
 Alleine
 Alleyn
 Allyn